XHDX-FM is a radio station broadcasting on 100.3 MHz FM in Ensenada, Baja California, Mexico. It is owned by Grupo Cadena.

History
XHDX began as XEDX-AM 1010. Its concession was awarded on September 19, 1959, to Mario Marcos Mayans, the founder of Grupo Cadena.

The station was long known as  before switching to news/talk in the 2000s. It briefly broadcast ESPN Deportes Radio from 2008 to 2009. 

The station migrated to FM in 2011 and shut down its AM transmitter in 2016. It has not broadcast since July 2022, owing to financial difficulties at Grupo Cadena.

References

External links

Radio stations in Ensenada, Baja California
Spanish-language radio stations
Radio stations established in 1959
1959 establishments in Mexico